Calverton Historic District is a national historic district located at Calverton, Fauquier County, Virginia.  It encompasses 69 contributing buildings and 2 contributing structures in the rural crossroads village of Calverton.  They include three dwellings, a church, a school, and three stores.  Notable buildings include a large farmstead, multiple dwellings, several commercial buildings, Wesleyan Methodist Church, the former high school now converted into apartments, and the old abandoned post office building.

It was listed on the National Register of Historic Places in 2010.

Gallery

References

Historic districts in Fauquier County, Virginia
National Register of Historic Places in Fauquier County, Virginia
Historic districts on the National Register of Historic Places in Virginia